Blue Mound or Blue Mounds may refer to any of several places in the United States:
Blue Mound, Illinois
Blue Mound, Kansas
Blue Mound (Vernon County, Missouri)
Blue Mound, Texas
Blue Mound State Park in Wisconsin
Blue Mounds Fort in Wisconsin
Blue Mounds (town), Wisconsin
Blue Mounds, Wisconsin
Blue Mounds State Park in Minnesota

See also

Blue Mound Township (disambiguation)